Nikita Andreyevich Krylov (born March 7, 1992) is a Russian professional mixed martial artist. He currently competes in the Light Heavyweight division in the Ultimate Fighting Championship (UFC). A professional since 2012, Krylov has also competed for M-1 Global. As of January 24, 2023, he is #6 in the UFC light heavyweight rankings.

Background
Krylov was born into a family from Krasnyi Luch in Ukraine. He originally began training in Kyokushin Karate at the age of ten, as his father had been a successful competitor in the sport himself. Krylov made the transition into mixed martial arts in 2012.

Mixed martial arts career

Early career
Krylov made his debut on July 27, 2012, at West Fight 4 in Donetsk, Ukraine, defeating Alexander Umrikhin via TKO. He won eleven more fights in the next five months (10 submissions, 1 TKO), before losing via submission to Vladimir Mishchenko on December 29 at Oplot Challenge 22. After two quick wins in a Gladiators Fighting Challenge tournament in Donetsk on January 19, 2013, he rematched Mishchenko on March 8 at Oplot Challenge 40, and again being submitted by an arm-triangle choke. A month later, he defeated Gabriel Tampu by TKO at M-1 Challenge 38 in St. Petersburg, Russia.

Ultimate Fighting Championship
With a record of 15–2, Krylov was signed by the UFC and made his debut on August 31, 2013, at UFC 164 against Soa Palelei. He lost via third-round TKO in a lackluster fight that saw both fighters exhausted after the first round. Krylov blamed his fatigue on nervousness and a long trip from Donetsk to Milwaukee.

Krylov returned on January 25, 2014, in the opening bout of UFC on Fox 7, against Walt Harris. He scored a 25-second TKO victory via head kick and follow-up punches.

Following the win, Krylov told reporters he was considering dropping down to the light heavyweight division for his next bout.

For his first fight at light heavyweight, Krylov replaced Thiago Silva against Ovince Saint Preux on March 15, 2015, at UFC 171. He was choked unconscious in the first round by a Von Flue choke while attempting a guillotine.

Krylov faced Cody Donovan on July 19, 2014, at UFC Fight Night 46. He won the fight by TKO in the final seconds of the first round.

Next he fought Stanislav Nedkov on January 24, 2015, at UFC on Fox 14. He won the fight by submission due to a standing guillotine choke just over a minute into the first round.

Krylov was briefly linked to a bout with Marcos Rogério de Lima on June 20, 2015, at UFC Fight Night 69.  However, the pairing was booked to take place a week later at UFC Fight Night 70.  Subsequently, Lima was removed from the card on June 19, after visa issues restricted his entry to the United States.  The bout with Lima was scheduled for a third time and took place on August 23, 2015, at UFC Fight Night 74. After surviving two guillotine attempts from Lima, Krylov won the fight by submission due to a rear-naked choke halfway through the first round.

Krylov was briefly linked to a matchup with Jimi Manuwa on February 27, 2016, at UFC Fight Night 84. However, Manuwa was scratched from the contest with an undisclosed injury in late December and the bout cancelled.

Krylov faced Francimar Barroso on May 8, 2016, at UFC Fight Night 87. Krylov won the fight via submission in the second round.

Krylov faced Ed Herman on July 30, 2016, at UFC 201. After a dominating first round for Krylov, he won the fight by knockout due to a head kick 40 seconds into the second.

Krylov next faced Misha Cirkunov on December 10, 2016, at UFC 206. He lost the fight via submission in the first round.

On February 17, 2017, it was reported, surprisingly to some, that Krylov had been released from the UFC. Krylov himself later explained his departure from the organization, saying that he had chosen to not re-sign his contract. He said that he liked to compete elsewhere to better his skills and be able to fight closer to his home in Ukraine.

Eurasia Fight Nights/Fight Nights Global
Following his UFC stint, Krylov signed a multi-fight contract with the Eurasia Fight Nights (EFN)/Fight Nights Global promotion.

He was set to make his promotional debut against former Bellator Light heavyweight Champion Emanuel Newton on June 2, 2017, at Fight Nights Global 68. However, Newton was later scrapped from the card and replaced by Stjepan Bekavac. Krylov won the fight by submission due to a guillotine choke, 53 seconds into the first round.

Next, he fought outside of his new promotion when he took on Maro Perak on August 26, 2017, for the Donbass Association of Combat Sports promotion. Krylov won the fight by TKO at the beginning of the second round.

Back in Fight Nights Global, Krylov got rescheduled against former Bellator Light heavyweight Champion Emanuel Newton on October 13, 2017, at Fight Nights Global 77. He won the fight by knockout from a knee, 43 seconds into the first round.

Krylov challenged for the FNG light heavyweight title against champion and fellow former UFC fighter Fabio Maldonado on May 19, 2018, at Fight Nights Global 87. He won the fight via knockout in the second round.

UFC return
In late June 2018, Fight Nights Global president Kamil Gadzhiev announced that the promotion has released Krylov from his contract in order to allow him to negotiate a new contract with the UFC.

Krylov faced Jan Błachowicz on September 15, 2018, at UFC Fight Night 136. He lost the fight via submission in the second round.

Krylov faced Ovince Saint Preux, in a re-match, on April 13, 2019, at UFC 236. He won the fight via a submission due to a rear-naked choke in round two.

Krylov faced Glover Teixeira on September 14, 2019, at UFC on ESPN+ 16.  He lost the back-and-forth fight via split decision, the first decision loss in his 32-fight career.

Krylov faced Johnny Walker on March 14, 2020, at UFC Fight Night 170. He won the fight via unanimous decision.

Krylov was expected to face Volkan Oezdemir on October 18, 2020, at UFC Fight Night 180.  However, Oezdemir pulled out of the fight in early October citing a knee injury. A replacement could not be found, so Krylov was removed from the card.

Krylov faced  Magomed Ankalaev on February 27, 2021, at UFC Fight Night 186. He lost the fight via unanimous decision.

Krylov faced Paul Craig on March 19, 2022, at UFC Fight Night 204. He lost the fight via a triangle choke in round one.

Krylov faced Alexander Gustafsson at UFC Fight Night 208. He won the fight via knockout in the first round. This win earned him the Performance of the Night award.

Krylov faced Volkan Oezdemir on October 22, 2022, at UFC 280. He won the bout via unanimous decision.

Krylov was scheduled to face Ryan Spann on February 25, 2023, at UFC Fight Night 220. However, the day of the event, Krylov fell ill and the main event was cancelled  and the pair was rescheduled to meet at UFC Fight Night: Yan vs. Dvalishvili two weeks later. He won the fight via a triangle choke submission in the first round.

Personal life
Krylov is enrolled at Donetsk Law Institute, and his heroes are Ilya Mate, Igor Vovchanchyn and Al Capone, after whom he is nicknamed and models his gimmick. Before his fight against Francimar Barroso, he changed his nickname from "Al Capone" to "The Miner" out of respect to his hometown (Donetsk), which consisted of many occupational miners.

Krylov is an open supporter of Donbass separatism, and has stated that if the Luhansk People's Republic ever received international recognition as a state, he would 'be the first in line for a passport.'  Whilst training in Kyiv, Krylov wore a uniform bearing the Russian flag, despite the war between the countries. This led to him being shunned from the gym, with members calling for action to be taken against him. Shortly thereafter, he relocated to Moscow.

Championships and accomplishments

Mixed martial arts
Ultimate Fighting Championship
 Performance of the Night (One time) 
Fight Nights Global
FNG Light heavyweight Championship (One time)
Gladiators FC
 GFC 2 Heavyweight Tournament Winner

Mixed martial arts record

|-
|Win
|align=center|30–9
|Ryan Spann
|Submission (triangle choke)
|UFC Fight Night: Yan vs. Dvalishvili
|
|align=center|1
|align=center|3:38
|Las Vegas, Nevada, United States
|
|-
|Win
|align=center|29–9
|Volkan Oezdemir
|Decision (unanimous)
|UFC 280
|
|align=center|3
|align=center|5:00
|Abu Dhabi, United Arab Emirates
|
|-
|Win
|align=center|28–9
|Alexander Gustafsson
|KO (punches)
|UFC Fight Night: Blaydes vs. Aspinall
|
|align=center|1
|align=center|1:07
|London, England
|
|-
|Loss
|align=center|27–9
|Paul Craig
|Submission (triangle choke)
|UFC Fight Night: Volkov vs. Aspinall
|
|align=center|1
|align=center|3:57
|London, England
|
|-
|Loss
|align=center|27–8
|Magomed Ankalaev
|Decision (unanimous)
|UFC Fight Night: Rozenstruik vs. Gane
|
|align=center|3
|align=center|5:00
|Las Vegas, Nevada, United States
|
|-
|Win
|align=center|27–7
|Johnny Walker
|Decision (unanimous)
|UFC Fight Night: Lee vs. Oliveira
|
|align=center|3
|align=center|5:00
|Brasília, Brazil
|
|-
|Loss
|align=center|26–7
|Glover Teixeira
|Decision (split)
|UFC Fight Night: Cowboy vs. Gaethje
|
|align=center|3
|align=center|5:00
|Vancouver, British Columbia, Canada
|
|-
|Win
|align=center|26–6
|Ovince Saint Preux
|Submission (rear-naked choke)
|UFC 236
|
|align=center|2
|align=center|2:30
|Atlanta, Georgia, United States
|
|-
|Loss
|align=center|25–6
|Jan Błachowicz
|Submission (arm-triangle choke)
|UFC Fight Night: Hunt vs. Oleinik
|
|align=center|2
|align=center|2:41
|Moscow, Russia
|
|-
|Win
|align=center|25–5
|Fábio Maldonado
|KO (punch)
|Fight Nights Global 87: Khachatryan vs. Queally
|
|align=center|2
|align=center|3:33
|Rostov-on-Don, Russia
|
|-
|Win
|align=center|24–5
|Emanuel Newton
|KO (knee)
|Fight Nights Global 77: Krylov vs. Newton
|
|align=center|1
|align=center|0:43
|Surgut, Russia
|
|-
|Win
|align=center|23–5
|Maro Perak
|TKO (punches)
|Donbass Association of Combat Sports: United Donbass
|
|align=center|2
|align=center|0:36
|Donetsk, Ukraine
|
|-
|Win
|align=center|22–5
|Stjepan Bekavac
|Submission (guillotine choke)
|Fight Nights Global 68: Pavlovich vs. Mokhnatkin
|
|align=center|1
|align=center|0:53
|Saint Petersburg, Russia
|
|-
|Loss
|align=center|21–5
|Misha Cirkunov
|Submission (guillotine choke)
|UFC 206
|
|align=center|1
|align=center|4:38
|Toronto, Ontario, Canada
|
|-
|Win
|align=center|21–4
|Ed Herman
|KO (head kick)
|UFC 201
|
|align=center|2
|align=center|0:40
|Atlanta, Georgia, United States
|
|-
|Win
|align=center|20–4
|Francimar Barroso
|Submission (rear-naked choke)
|UFC Fight Night: Overeem vs. Arlovski
|
|align=center|2
|align=center|3:11
|Rotterdam, Netherlands
|
|-
|Win
|align=center|19–4
|Marcos Rogério de Lima
|Submission (rear-naked choke)
|UFC Fight Night: Holloway vs. Oliveira
|
|align=center|1
|align=center|2:29
|Saskatoon, Saskatchewan, Canada
|
|-
|Win
|align=center|18–4
|Stanislav Nedkov
|Submission (standing guillotine choke)
|UFC on Fox: Gustafsson vs. Johnson
|
|align=center|1
|align=center|1:24
|Stockholm, Sweden
|
|-
|Win
|align=center|17–4
|Cody Donovan
|TKO (punches)
|UFC Fight Night: McGregor vs. Brandão
|
|align=center|1
|align=center|4:57
|Dublin, Ireland
|
|-
|Loss
|align=center|16–4
|Ovince Saint Preux
|Technical Submission (Von Flue choke)
|UFC 171
|
|align=center|1
|align=center|1:29
|Dallas, Texas, United States
|
|-
|Win
|align=center|16–3
|Walt Harris
|TKO (head kick and punches)
|UFC on Fox: Henderson vs. Thomson
|
|align=center|1
|align=center|0:25
|Chicago, Illinois, United States
|
|-
|Loss
|align=center|15–3
|Soa Palelei
|TKO (punches)
|UFC 164
|
|align=center|3
|align=center|1:34
|Milwaukee, Wisconsin, United States
|
|-
|Win
|align=center|15–2
|Gabriel Tampu
|TKO (punches)
|M-1 Challenge 38
|
|align=center|1
|align=center|4:27
|Saint Petersburg, Russia
|
|-
|Loss
|align=center|14–2
|Vladimir Mishchenko
|Submission (arm-triangle choke)
|Oplot Challenge 40
|
|align=center|1
|align=center|0:58
|Kharkiv, Ukraine
|
|-
|Win
|align=center|14–1
|Kylychbek Sarkarbaev	
|TKO (punches)
|Gladiators FC 2
|
|align=center|1
|align=center|0:49
|Donetsk, Ukraine
|
|-
|Win
|align=center|13–1
|Julian Bogdanov
|KO (punch)
|Gladiators FC 2
|
|align=center|1
|align=center|1:17
|Donetsk, Ukraine
|
|-
|Loss
|align=center|12–1
|Vladimir Mishchenko
|Submission (arm-triangle choke)
|Oplot Challenge 22
|
|align=center|1
|align=center|1:47
|Kharkiv, Ukraine
|
|-
|Win
|align=center|12–0
|Denis Simkin
|Submission (americana)
|Gladiators FC 1
|
|align=center|1
|align=center|0:35
|Donetsk, Ukraine
|
|-
|Win
|align=center|11–0
|Valery Scherbakov
|Submission (Achilles lock)
|Warriors Honor: Igor Vovchanchyn Cup
|
|align=center|1
|align=center|1:38
|Kharkiv, Ukraine
|
|-
|Win
|align=center|10–0
|Vladimir Gerasimchik
|Submission (kimura)
|Oplot Challenge 7
|
|align=center|1
|align=center|1:35
|Kharkiv, Ukraine
|
|-
|Win
|align=center|9–0
|Igor Kukurudziak
|Submission (kimura)
|ECSF: Kolomyi Cup
|
|align=center|1
|align=center|2:47
|Kolomyia, Ukraine
|
|-
|Win
|align=center|8–0
|Viktor Smirnov
|TKO (doctor stoppage)
|ECSF: MMA Lion Cup
|
|align=center|1
|align=center|0:12
|Lviv, Ukraine
|
|-
|Win
|align=center|7–0
|Anatoliy Didenko
|Submission (Achilles lock)
|Oplot Challenge 4
|
|align=center|1
|align=center|0:29
|Kharkiv, Ukraine
|
|-
|Win
|align=center|6–0
|Alexey Stepanov
|Submission (rear-naked choke)
|ECSF: MMA Ukraine Cup 7
|
|align=center|1
|align=center|0:29
|Donetsk, Ukraine
|
|-
|Win
|align=center|5–0
|Svyatoslav Scherbakov
|Submission (armbar)
|ECSF: MMA Ukraine Cup 6
|
|align=center|1
|align=center|1:44
|Pervomaisk, Ukraine
|
|-
|Win
|align=center|4–0
|Anatoliy Didenko
|Submission (rear-naked choke)
|ECSF: MMA Ukraine Cup 5
|
|align=center|1
|align=center|2:08
|Cherkassy, Ukraine
|
|-
|Win
|align=center|3–0
|Alexey Artemenko
|Submission (guillotine choke)
|Big Boys Fights
|
|align=center| 1
|align=center| 2:20
|Donetsk, Ukraine
| 
|-
|Win
|align=center|2–0
|Denis Bogdanov
|Submission (rear-naked choke)
|ECSF: Cup of West Ukraine 2012
|
|align=center|1
|align=center|1:31
|Truskavets, Ukraine
|
|-
|Win
|align=center|1–0
|Alexander Umrikhin
|TKO (punches)
|West Fight 4
|
|align=center|1
|align=center|0:56
|Donetsk, Ukraine
|
|-

See also
 List of current UFC fighters
 List of male mixed martial artists

References

External links
 
 

1992 births
Ukrainian male mixed martial artists
Heavyweight mixed martial artists
Light heavyweight mixed martial artists
Sportspeople from Donetsk
Living people
Ukrainian male karateka
Mixed martial artists utilizing Kyokushin kaikan
Mixed martial artists utilizing ARB
Ukrainian people of Russian descent
Ultimate Fighting Championship male fighters